Crooked Stilo is a hip-hop duo formed by brothers Victor and Johnny Lopez, known for combining hip hop with cumbia, with some reggaeton influences.

Career
The duo released three albums with Univision Music Group and Fonovisa Records: Puro Escandalo, Retrasalo, and Malhablados.

The duo left Fonovisa/Univision in 2007 and started their own record label, Mi Estilo Records.  They have released 3 albums through the newly formed label: Cumbia Urbana: The Album, Los Titulares, and Calles Chuekas.

Discography
Studio albums

Singles & EPs

Guest appearances

References

External links
 Official website
 Crooked Stilo's YouTube Channel

Salvadoran emigrants to the United States
American hip hop groups
Hispanic and Latino American rappers